May Cridlan is a South African international lawn and indoor bowler.

Bowls career
In 1969 she won the gold medal in the pairs (with Elsie McDonald) and the fours at the 1969 World Outdoor Bowls Championship in Sydney, Australia. She also won a gold medal in the team event (Taylor Trophy).

References

Living people
South African female bowls players
Bowls World Champions
Year of birth missing (living people)